is a monthly Japanese shōjo manga magazine under the publication of Shogakukan. In their official website they also refer to themselves as Monthly Cheese!

The magazine caters to young female readers. The theme of the featured manga revolves around romance and mature relationships. The serialization is said to be running as of 1996 and is sister comics to Shogakukan's other magazines like Sho-comic.

Manga artists and series listed in Cheese!

Current
Coffee & Vanilla (2015–present) 
37.5°C no Namida
The King's Beast (2019–present)

Past
Dawn of the Arcana (2003–2013)
Honey Hunt (2006–2009)
Pin to Kona (2009–2015)
Kanojo wa Uso o Aishisugiteru (2009–2017)
The Water Dragon's Bride (2015–2019)
Yakuza Lover (2019–2022)
Suteinu ni Honey Toast
Bonnou Puzzle
1 Manbun no 1
Watashi wa Tensai o Katte Iru.
Kurogenji Monogatari – Hana to Miruramu
Namete, Kajitte, Tokidoki Medete

References

External links

Other Shougokan related information
Official Cheese!’s Ikebo x Shōjo Manga Genga-ten (Tokyo, 2018)

1996 establishments in Japan
Magazines established in 1996
Magazines published in Tokyo
Monthly manga magazines published in Japan
Shōjo manga magazines
Shogakukan magazines